An altar lamp, also known as a chancel lamp, refers to a light which is located in the chancel (sanctuary), of various Christian churches. In Anglican, Old Catholic and Roman Catholic churches, the chancel lamp burns before a tabernacle or ambry to demonstrate the belief of the Real Presence of Christ in the Blessed Sacrament which is reserved in these denominations. It is also found in the chancel of Lutheran and Methodist churches to indicate the presence of Christ in the sanctuary, as well as a belief in the Real Presence of Christ in the Eucharist. The sanctuary lamp may also be seen in Eastern Orthodox Churches. Other Christian denominations burn the lamp as a symbol of the light of Christ always burning in an otherwise sin-darkened world.

The practice is also influenced by Judaism in the Old Testament; in the book of Exodus, God told Moses that a lamp filled with the pure oil should perpetually burn in the Tabernacle. This is the precedent for the custom in the Anglican Church and Catholic Church of burning a candle (at all times) before the tabernacle – the house where the Eucharistic Body of Christ is reserved under lock and key. In Jewish practice, this Altar lamp is known for its Hebrew name, Ner Tamid (Hebrew: "eternal flame or eternal light"). Many Christian churches have at least one lamp continually burning, often before an ambry or tabernacle, not only as an ornament of the altar, but for the purpose of worship. The General Instruction of the Roman Missal in the Catholic Church, for instance, states (in 316). "In accordance with traditional custom, near the tabernacle a special lamp, fueled by oil or wax, should be kept alight to indicate and honor the presence of Christ."

Such sanctuary or tabernacle lamps are often coloured red, though this is not prescribed by law. This serves to distinguish this light from other votive lights within the church. In the Catholic Church, red is widely used. The use of multiple lights, always in odd numbers, i.e., three, five, seven, or more, in place of a single lamp has now become rarer, though it is still seen in some older Catholic churches and in eastern Christian churches. The lamp may be suspended by a rope or chain over the tabernacle or near the entry of the sanctuary, or it may be affixed to a wall. It is also sometimes placed on a ledge beside the tabernacle or on an individual stand placed on the floor. Oil lamps or candles may be used.

See also
Sanctuary lamp

References

Church architecture
Altars